This is a list of types of medical therapy, including forms of traditional medicine and alternative medicine. For psychotherapies and other behavioral and psychological intervention methods, see list of psychotherapies.

 abortive therapy
 acupressure (some scientific aspects, many prescientific)
 acupuncture (some scientific aspects, many prescientific)
 adjunct therapy
 adjunctive therapy
 adjuvant therapy
 alternative therapy (two senses: a second choice among scientific therapies, or alternative medicine)
 androgen replacement therapy
 animal-assisted therapy
 antibody therapy
 antihormone therapy
 antiserum therapy
 aquarium therapy
 aquatic therapy (nonscientific and scientific forms)
 aromatherapy
 art therapy
 Auger therapy
 aurotherapy
 autism therapies
 autologous immune enhancement therapy
 balneotherapy
 bioidentical hormone replacement therapy (some scientific aspects, some pseudoscientific)
 biotherapy
 blood irradiation therapy
 brachytherapy
 cardiac resynchronization therapy
 cell therapy
 cytotherapy
 cell transfer therapy
 chelation therapy
 chemotherapy
 Chinese food therapy (some scientific aspects, mostly prescientific)
 chiropractic therapy (some scientific aspects, some pseudoscientific)
 chronotherapy (treatment scheduling)
 chrysotherapy
 climatotherapy
 cobalt therapy
 cold compression therapy
 combination therapy
 consolidation therapy
 contrast bath therapy
 counseling
 craniosacral therapy (mostly pseudoscientific)
 cryotherapy
 crystal therapy (mostly pre- and pseudoscientific)
 cupping therapy
 curative therapy
 cytoluminescent therapy (mostly pseudoscientific)
 dark therapy
 definitive therapy
 destination therapy
 diathermy
 diesel therapy (ironic name)
 dietary therapy (various nonscientific and scientific forms)
 drug therapy
 duct tape occlusion therapy (mechanism unknown but has had some scientific study)
 electrohomeopathy (electropathy)
 electroconvulsive therapy
 electromagnetic therapy
 electromagnetic therapy (alternative medicine) (pseudoscientific)
 electron therapy
 electrotherapy
 empiric therapy (two senses, one scientific, one not)
 energy therapy (mostly pre- and pseudoscientific)
 enzyme replacement therapy
 epigenetic therapy
 equine therapy
 estrogen replacement therapy
 exercise therapy
 extracorporeal shockwave therapy
 fast neutron therapy
 Feldenkrais therapy (not entirely scientific, but empirical)
 feminizing hormone therapy
 fluoride therapy
 gene therapy
 gene therapy for color blindness
 gene therapy for epilepsy
 gene therapy for osteoarthritis
 gene therapy in Parkinson's disease
 gene therapy of the human retina
 gold standard therapy
 grape therapy (prescientific and quackery forms)
 Greyhound therapy (ironic name)
 halotherapy (mostly prescientific; see also mineral spa)
 heat therapy
 helminthic therapy
 herbal therapy (prescientific and pseudoscientific forms; compare phytotherapy)
 hippotherapy
 hormone therapy
 hormonal therapy (oncology)
 hormone replacement therapy
 horticultural therapy
 host modulatory therapy
 hydrotherapy (nonscientific and scientific forms)
 hyperbaric oxygen therapy
 hyperthermia therapy
 hypothermia therapy for neonatal encephalopathy
 ichthyotherapy (prescientific but empirical)
 immunosuppressive therapy
 immunotherapy
 induction therapy
 intraoperative electron radiation therapy
 intraoperative radiation therapy
 intravenous immunoglobulin therapy
 intravenous therapy
 inversion therapy
 investigational therapy
 laser therapy
 leech therapy (prescientific and scientific forms)
 light therapy
 lithium therapy
 low level laser therapy
 maggot therapy
 magnet therapy
 magnetic resonance therapy
 maintenance therapy
 manual therapy
 martial arts therapy
 masculinizing hormone therapy
 massage therapy
 medical gas therapy
 medical nutrition therapy
 medical therapy in general contexts means therapy and within medical contexts often means specifically pharmacotherapy 
 mesotherapy (pseudoscientific)
 microwave thermotherapy
 mindfullness
 molecular chaperone therapy
 molecular therapy
 monoclonal antibody therapy
 monotherapy
 mud therapy (prescientific)
 music therapy
 negative air ionization therapy
 neoadjuvant therapy
 neurologic music therapy
 Neuro therapy
 neutron capture therapy of cancer
 neutron therapy
 occupational therapy
 oral rehydration therapy
 osmotherapy
 oxygen therapy
 ozone therapy
 palliative therapy
 particle therapy
 pet therapy
 phage therapy
 pharmacotherapy
 phonemic neurological hypochromium therapy
 photodynamic therapy
 phototherapy
 photothermal therapy
 physical therapy
 physiotherapy
 phytotherapy
 platin therapy
 polychemotherapy
 polytherapy
 preventive therapy
 prolotherapy
 prophylactic therapy
 protein therapy
 proton therapy

 pulsed electromagnetic field therapy
 PUVA therapy
 qigong therapy
 quack therapies
 radiation therapy
 radiotherapy
 rehydration therapy
 rescue therapy
 respiratory therapy
 retail therapy (semifacetious name)
 salt therapy (mostly prescientific; see also mineral spa)
 salvage therapy
 serotherapy
 sex therapy
 sonodynamic therapy (mostly pseudoscientific)
 sound therapy
 spa therapy (prescientific and pseudoscientific forms)
 speech therapy
 speleotherapy (mostly prescientific; see also mineral spa)
 stem cell therapy
 step therapy
 stepladder therapy
 stepdown therapy
 stereotactic radiation therapy
 supportive therapy
 systemic therapy
 sweat therapy (mostly prescientific; see also sauna and mineral spa)
 tai chi therapy
 targeted therapy
 thalassotherapy
 thermotherapy
 TK cell therapy
 tolerogenic therapy
 transdermal continuous oxygen therapy
 transgender hormone therapy
 ultraviolet light therapy
 urine therapy (some scientific forms; various prescientific or pseudoscientific forms)
 virotherapy
 wake therapy
 Waon therapy
 water cure therapy

See also 
 List of psychotherapies
 Public health
 Therapeutic jurisprudence

Medical lists
Medical treatments
Alternative medical treatments